Marcel Defosse (15 April 1906 – 15 August 2000) was a Belgian journalist who used the name Denis Marion.

Defosse played for Belgium in the 1937 Chess Olympiad.

References

External links
 

1906 births
2000 deaths
Belgian chess players
Male journalists
Belgian writers in French
Free University of Brussels (1834–1969) alumni
People from Saint-Josse-ten-Noode
Chess Olympiad competitors
20th-century Belgian dramatists and playwrights
Belgian male dramatists and playwrights
20th-century chess players
20th-century Belgian journalists
20th-century pseudonymous writers